Harmologa amplexana is a species of moth of the family Tortricidae.It is endemic to New Zealand.

The forewings whitish with scattered dark fuscous scales in irregular transverse strigulae (fine streaks). The costa and inner margin are strigulated with dark fuscous. In males, the basal patch is represented by a sharply-defined blackish-fuscous streak. In females, it is represented by an internally suffused dark fuscous streak. The hindwings are whitish, faintly tinged with yellow and spotted with grey.

References

Moths described in 1875
Archipini
Taxa named by Philipp Christoph Zeller
Endemic fauna of New Zealand
Endemic moths of New Zealand